The Moroccan National Road Championships are held annually to decide the cycling champions in both the road race and time trial discipline, across various categories.

Men

Road race

Under-23

Time trial

Under-23

Women

References

National road cycling championships
Cycle races in Morocco